The Chthonic Chronicles is the sixth studio album by English metal band Bal-Sagoth. The first in five years since 2001's Atlantis Ascendant, it is rumoured to be their last album. This album was released in Europe on 10 March 2006 through Nuclear Blast and in the US on 16 May through Candlelight Records. A remastered digipak edition from Metal Mind Productions followed in October 2011, while a second digipak release from Dissonance Productions and a limited edition gatefold vinyl version from Night of the Vinyl Dead were issued in October 2020.

Background 

The Chthonic Chronicles is rumoured to be the band's final album. Their first album's introduction song is called "Hatheg-Kla", and the final song on The Chthonic Chronicles is called "Return to Hatheg-Kla", perhaps making their vision of an epic Hexalogy come full circle. Although Bal-Sagoth vocalist-lyricist Byron Roberts most often refers to The Chthonic Chronicles as "the end of the Hexalogy", this could also refer to the end of this particular set of stories. Byron has stated himself that there is an abundance of lyrical material left for the possible continuation of Bal-Sagoth.

Lyrical content
The obscurely-worded album title refers to a key story element in the lyrics, and the chronicles themselves are a pure work of fiction from lyrics writer Roberts. The very rare word has been used in literature by T. S. Eliot, C. F. Keary and M. McCarthy, and is Greek in origin, meaning "earthly", specifically dealing with the underworld and spirits. (For more information, see Chthonic.)

Bal-Sagoth's now-established tradition of lyrics revolving around antediluvian settings, such as Atlantis, Lemuria and Mu, is once again present, and song titles such as "Shackled to the Trilithon of Kutulu" indicate that a heavy H. P. Lovecraft inspiration is present too. The band continues previous storylines (which began on previous albums) in the songs "Invocations Beyond the Outer-World Night", "The Obsidian Crown Unbound" and "Unfettering the Hoary Sentinels of Karnak".

Reissues 

In November 2011, The Chthonic Chronicles was reissued as a limited edition digipak by Nuclear Blast's affiliate label Metal Mind Productions. The reissue featured an expanded lyric booklet, additional artwork and remastered audio.

On October 16, 2020, The Chthonic Chronicles was reissued as a digipak CD edition via Dissonance Productions.

In October 2020, The Chthonic Chronicles was reissued as a double-vinyl gatefold edition limited to 400 copies, under license to the Italian record label "Night of the Vinyl Dead".

In May 2022, The Chthonic Chronicles was reissued as a double LP gatefold edition via the UK specialist vinyl label Back On Black.

Track listing 
 All lyrics written by Byron Roberts, all music written by Jonny Maudling and Chris Maudling.

Personnel 
 Byron Roberts – vocals, artwork concept
 Chris Maudling – guitars
 Jonny Maudling – keyboards
 Mark Greenwell – bass
 Dan "Storm" Mullins – drums

Additional personnel
 Martin Hanford - cover art
 Mags - engineering (vocals)
 Achim Köhler - mastering

References

External links 

 The Chthonic Chronicles at Discogs

Bal-Sagoth albums
2006 albums
Cthulhu Mythos music